Yom Tov Algazi (known as the Maharit Algazi; 1727, Izmir – 1802, Jerusalem), the son of Israel Yaakov Algazi, was an Ottoman rabbi who studied under Rabbi Shalom Sharabi and authored major halakhic works. He succeeded Sharabi as head of Beit El and served as Chief Rabbi of Jerusalem and the rest of the country from 1777 until his death.

He often traveled to Europe to solicit funds for the Jerusalem community and was warmly welcomed by Hungarian rabbis Moses Sofer and Akiva Eiger. In 1773 he visited Bordeaux, France.

When rumors spread that the Jews of Jerusalem were planning to aid Napoleon's conquest of the city, Algazi publicly declared loyalty to the Turks and gathered the community to offer prayers for an Ottoman victory at the Wailing Wall. Together with Rabbi Mordechai Meyuchas, Algazi organised a Jewish contingent to reinforce the city's defenses.

The names of his published works are: Get Mekushar (1767), Shemot Yom Tov and Hilkhot Yom Tov (1794), Kedushat Yom Tov (1843).

References

Chief rabbis of Jerusalem
People from İzmir
Smyrniote Jews
Sephardi Jews in Ottoman Palestine
Burials at the Jewish cemetery on the Mount of Olives
1727 births
1802 deaths
Rishon LeZion (rabbi)